The Yates Center Courthouse Square Historic District, in Yates Center in Woodson County, Kansas, is a  historic district which was listed on the National Register of Historic Places in 1986.  The district included 33 contributing buildings and two contributing structures.

Architect Grant Naylor and others have works included in the district. Architectural styles include Italianate, Romanesque Revival, and early 20th century commercial. 

It includes the Woodson County Courthouse, the Yates Center Courthouse Square,  the Yates Center National Bank at 100 N. Main St., the Masonic Lodge Building at 101 N State St., and others.

References

External links
Photo of buildings in the district, on last page bottom right

Historic districts in Kansas
Government buildings on the National Register of Historic Places in Kansas
Italianate architecture in Kansas
Romanesque Revival architecture in Kansas
Woodson County, Kansas